Aarón Gordian Martínez (born 4 May 1964 in Mexico City) is a paralympic athlete from Mexico competing mainly in category T54 wheelchair racing events.

Aaron has competed in multiple events at seven Paralympics between 1984 and 2008 inclusive.  His medals have come in the 200m in 1988 a bronze and a silver in the 5000m in 2004, while the distances raced range from 100m up to marathon.

References 

Paralympic athletes of Mexico
Athletes from Mexico City
Athletes (track and field) at the 1984 Summer Paralympics
Athletes (track and field) at the 1988 Summer Paralympics
Athletes (track and field) at the 1992 Summer Paralympics
Athletes (track and field) at the 1996 Summer Paralympics
Athletes (track and field) at the 2000 Summer Paralympics
Athletes (track and field) at the 2004 Summer Paralympics
Athletes (track and field) at the 2008 Summer Paralympics
Paralympic silver medalists for Mexico
Paralympic bronze medalists for Mexico
Living people
Medalists at the 1988 Summer Paralympics
Medalists at the 2004 Summer Paralympics
1964 births
Paralympic medalists in athletics (track and field)
Medalists at the 2007 Parapan American Games
Medalists at the 2011 Parapan American Games
Mexican male wheelchair racers